Azolla (mosquito fern, duckweed fern, fairy moss, water fern) is a genus of seven species of aquatic ferns in the family Salviniaceae. They are extremely reduced in form and specialized, looking nothing like other typical ferns but more resembling duckweed or some mosses. Azolla filiculoides is one of just two fern species for which a reference genome has been published. It is believed that this genus grew so prolifically during the Eocene (and thus absorbed such a large amount of carbon) that it triggered a global cooling event that has lasted to the present.

Azolla is considered an invasive plant in wetlands, freshwater lakes and ditches. It can alter aquatic ecosystems and biodiversity substantially.

Phylogeny
Phylogeny of Azolla

Other species include:

At least six extinct species are known from the fossil record:
Azolla intertrappea Sahni & H.S. Rao, 1934 (Eocene, India)
Azolla berryi Brown, 1934 (Eocene, Green River Formation, Wyoming)
Azolla prisca Chandler & Reid, 1926 (Oligocene, London Clay, Isle of Wight)
Azolla tertiaria Berry, 1927 (Pliocene, Esmeralda Formation, Nevada)
Azolla primaeva (Penhallow) Arnold, 1955 (Eocene, Allenby Formation, British Columbia)
Azolla boliviensis Vajda & McLoughlin, 2005 (Maastrichtian - Paleocene, Eslaboacuten Formation and Flora Formation Bolivia)

Ecology

Azolla is a highly productive plant. It can double its biomass in as little as 1.9 days, depending on growing conditions, and yield can reach 8–10 tonnes fresh matter/ha in Asian rice fields. 37.8 t fresh weight/ha (2.78 t DM/ha dry weight) has been reported for Azolla pinnata in India (Hasan et al., 2009).

Azolla floats on the surface of water by means of numerous small, closely overlapping scale-like leaves, with their roots hanging in the water. They form a symbiotic relationship with the cyanobacterium Anabaena azollae, an extracellular endosymbiont (living outside the host's cells) which fixes atmospheric nitrogen. The typical limiting factor on its growth is phosphorus; thus, an abundance of phosphorus - due for example to eutrophication or chemical runoff - often leads to Azolla blooms. Unlike all other known plants, its symbiotic microorganism transfers directly from one generation to the next. A. azollae is completely dependent on its host, as several of its genes have either been lost or transferred to the nucleus in Azolla's cells.

The nitrogen-fixing capability of Azolla has led to widespread use as a biofertiliser, especially in parts of southeast Asia. The plant has been used to bolster agricultural productivity in China for over a thousand years. When rice paddies are flooded in the spring, they can be planted with Azolla, which then quickly multiplies to cover the water, suppressing weeds. The rotting plant material resulting from the die off of this Azolla releases nitrogen into the water for the rice plants, providing up to nine tonnes of protein per hectare per year.

Azolla are weeds in many parts of the world, entirely covering some bodies of water. The myth that no mosquito can penetrate the coating of fern to lay its eggs in the water gives the plant its common name "mosquito fern", and may deter the survival of some of the larvae.

Most species can produce large amounts of deoxyanthocyanins in response to various stresses, including bright sunlight and extreme temperatures, causing the water surface to appear to be covered with an intensely red carpet. Herbivore feeding induces accumulation of deoxyanthocyanins and leads to a reduction in the proportion of polyunsaturated fatty acids in the fronds, thus lowering their palatability and nutritive value.

Azolla cannot survive winters with prolonged freezing, so is often grown as an ornamental plant at high latitudes where it cannot establish itself firmly enough to become a weed. It is also not tolerant of salinity; normal plants cannot survive in greater than 1–1.6‰, and even conditioned organisms die if grown in water with a salinity above 5.5‰.

Azolla filiculoides
Azolla filiculoides (red azolla) is the only member of this genus and of the family Azollaceae in Tasmania. It is a common native aquatic plant in Tasmania. It is common behind farm dams and other still waterbodies. The plants are small (usually only a few cm across) and float, but they are fast growing, and can be abundant and form large mats. The plants are typically red, and have small, water repellent leaves.

Reproduction

Azolla reproduces sexually, and asexually (by splitting).

Like all ferns, sexual reproduction leads to spore formation, but unlike other members of this group Azolla is heterosporous, producing spores of two kinds. During the summer months, numerous spherical structures called sporocarps form on the undersides of the branches. The male sporocarp is greenish or reddish and looks like the egg mass of an insect or spider. It is two millimeters in diameter, and bears numerous male sporangia. Male spores (microspores) are extremely small and are produced inside each microsporangium. Microspores tend to adhere in clumps called massulae.

Female sporocarps are much smaller, containing one sporangium and one functional spore. Since an individual female spore is considerably larger than a male spore, it is termed a megaspore.

Azolla has microscopic male and female gametophytes that develop inside the male and female spores. The female gametophyte protrudes from the megaspore and bears a small number of archegonia, each containing a single egg. The microspore forms a male gametophyte with a single antheridium which produces eight swimming sperm. The barbed glochidia on the male spore clusters cause them to cling to the female megaspores, thus facilitating fertilization.

Applications

Food and animal feed
In addition to its traditional cultivation as a bio-fertilizer for wetland paddies, Azolla is finding increasing use for sustainable production of livestock feed. Azolla is rich in protein, essential amino acids, vitamins, and minerals. Studies describe feeding Azolla to dairy cattle, pigs, ducks, and chickens, with reported increases in milk production, weight of broiler chickens and egg production of layers, as compared to conventional feed. One FAO study describes how Azolla integrates into a tropical biomass agricultural system, reducing the need for food supplements. Concerns about biomagnification exist because the plant may contain the neurotoxin BMAA that remains present in the bodies of animals consuming it and BMAA has been documented as passing along the food chain. Azolla may contain this substance that is a possible cause of neurodegenerative diseases. Azolla has been suggested as a foodstuff for human consumption, however, no long-term studies of the safety of eating Azolla have been made on humans. Previous studies attributed neurotoxin production to Anabaena flos-aquae species, which is also a type of nitrogen-fixing cyanobacteria. Further research may be needed to ascertain if A. azollae produces neurotoxins.

Companion plant
Azolla has been used for at least one thousand years in rice paddies as a companion plant, to fix nitrogen and to block out light to prevent competition from other plants. Rice is planted when tall enough to poke through the Azolla layer. Mats of mature Azolla can also be used as a weed-suppressing mulch.

Rice farmers used Azolla as a rice biofertilizer 1500 years ago. The earliest known written record of this practice is in a book written by Jia Ssu Hsieh (Jia Si Xue) in 540 A.D on The Art of Feeding the People (Chih Min Tao Shu). By the end of the Ming dynasty in the early 17th century, Azolla’s use as a green compost was documented in local records.

Larvicide
The myth that no mosquito can penetrate the coating of fern to lay its eggs in the water gives the plant its common name "mosquito fern". Azolla have been used to control mosquito larvae in rice fields. The plant grows in a thick mat on the surface of the water, making it more difficult for the larvae to reach the surface to breathe, effectively choking the larvae.

Climate change
Azolla has been proposed as a carbon sequestration modality. The proposal draws upon the hypothesized Azolla event that asserts that Azolla once covered the Arctic and then sank, permanently sequestering teratons of carbon that would otherwise have contributed to the planet's greenhouse effect and ending a warming event that reached  degrees warmer than twenty-first century averages.

They contribute significantly to decreasing the atmospheric CO2 levels.

Invasive species
This fern has been introduced to other parts of the world, including the United Kingdom, where it has become a pest in some areas. A nominally tropical plant, it has adapted to the colder climate.

Importance in paleoclimatology

A study of Arctic paleoclimatology reported that Azolla may have had a significant role in reversing an increase in greenhouse effect that occurred 55 million years ago that had caused the region around the north pole to turn into a hot, tropical environment. This research was conducted by the Institute of Environmental Biology at Utrecht University. It indicates that massive patches of Azolla growing on the (then) freshwater surface of the Arctic Ocean consumed enough carbon dioxide from the atmosphere for the global greenhouse effect to decline, eventually causing the formation of ice sheets in Antarctica and the current "icehouse period". This theory has been termed the Azolla event.

Bioremediation

Azolla can remove chromium, nickel, copper, zinc, and lead from effluent. It can also remove lead from solutions containing 1–1000 ppm.

References

External links
The Azolla Foundation: Azolla Non-Profit Information & Guidance Website
Azolla Philippines: A website dedicated to the distribution of Azolla for propagation as alternative livestock feed.
Marriage Between A Fern & Cyanobacterium 
NSW Flora online: Azolla

Aquatic plants
Extant Maastrichtian first appearances
Fern genera
Invasive plant species in Japan
Klondike Mountain Formation
Maastrichtian genus first appearances
Nitrogen-fixing crops
Salviniales
Taxa named by Jean-Baptiste Lamarck